Agrocybe pediades is a typically lawn and other types of grassland mushroom, but can also grow on mulch containing horse manure. It was first described as Agaricus pediades by Swedish mycologist Elias Magnus Fries in 1821, and moved to its current genus Agrocybe by Victor Fayod in 1889. A synonym for this mushroom is Agrocybe semiorbicularis, though some guides list these separately. Technically it is edible, but it could be confused with poisonous species, including one of the genus Hebeloma.

Description 
The mushroom cap is 1–3 cm wide, round to convex (flattening with age), pale yellow to orange-brown, smooth, sometimes cracked, and tacky with moisture but otherwise dry. The stalks are 2–5 cm tall and 1–3 mm wide. A partial veil quickly disappears, leaving traces on the cap's edge, but no ring on the stem. The cap's odor and taste are mild or mealy.

The spores are brown, elliptical, and smooth. Some experts divide A. pediades into several species, mainly by habitat and microscopic features, such as spore size. It is recognized by the large, slightly compressed basidiospores which have a large central germ pore, 4-spored basidia, subcapitate cheilocystidia and, rarely, the development of pleurocystidia.

This species is edible, but it could be confused with poisonous species, including one of the genus Hebeloma. Some field guides just list it as inedible or say that it is not worthwhile.

Similar species 
Similar species include Agrocybe praecox and A. putaminum.

References 

Strophariaceae